John Montgomery was a Scottish professional football goalkeeper who played in the Scottish League for Motherwell, Port Glasgow Athletic and Hamilton Academical.

Career statistics

Honours 
Hamilton Academical

 Lanarkshire Cup: 1909–10 (shared)
 Lanarkshire Express Cup: 1909–10

References 

Scottish footballers
Brentford F.C. players
Southern Football League players
Scottish Football League players
Date of death missing
Motherwell F.C. players
Association football goalkeepers
Port Glasgow Athletic F.C. players
1881 births
Footballers from North Ayrshire
Ardeer Thistle F.C. players
Hamilton Academical F.C. players
People from Stevenston